As Sure as the Dawn (1995) is a novel by Francine Rivers, and the third book in the Mark of the Lion Series.

The novel follows the life of Atretes after winning his freedom in the arena. This novel covers the search for his believed dead son, finding him with a widowed Christian woman, Rizpah, and their travels back to Atretes' homeland in Germania. Here a whole new world unfolds as Atretes is confronted with Christianity, loyalty, love, friendship, family and tradition.

References

1993 American novels
Mark of the Lion Series
Gladiatorial combat in fiction